Joseph Frederick Harold Gerald Ashmore (25 July 1936 – 25 August 2021) was a British motor racing driver from England. He participated in four Formula One World Championship Grands Prix, scoring no championship points.

Life
Ashmore started his career in Formula Junior along with his brother Chris, in 1960. Later that year he competed at Zeltweg and Innsbruck, finishing third behind Hans Herrmann and Wolfgang von Trips. In 1961 he moved up to Formula One with a privately run Lotus 18, and scored a second place in the Naples Grand Prix after taking pole position. Later that year he took part in the British Grand Prix but retired after just a few laps. His last appearance in a World Championship event was in his Lotus in 1962 at Monza, when he failed to qualify.

He died from cancer in August 2021 at the age of 85.

Complete Formula One World Championship results
(key)

Non-championship
(key) (Races in bold indicate pole position)

References

External links
Profile at grandprix.com

1936 births
2021 deaths
English Formula One drivers
English racing drivers
Sportspeople from West Bromwich